John Wood (1880–1916) was a professional footballer who played for Manchester City, Plymouth Argyle, Huddersfield Town and Aberdeen. He enlisted in the 1st Football Battalion of the Middlesex Regiment during the First World War and died during the Battle of the Somme.

References

English footballers
Association football forwards
English Football League players
Manchester City F.C. players
Plymouth Argyle F.C. players
Huddersfield Town A.F.C. players
Aberdeen F.C. players
Scottish Football League players
Place of birth missing
1880 births
1916 deaths
British Army personnel of World War I
Middlesex Regiment soldiers
British military personnel killed in the Battle of the Somme